The Tahoe Regional Planning Agency (TRPA) was formed in 1969 through a bi-state compact between California and Nevada which was ratified by the U.S. Congress.  The agency is mandated to protect the environment of the Lake Tahoe basin through land-use regulations and is one of only a few watershed-based regulatory agencies in the United States.

Mission
TRPA and its mission are one-of-a-kind and represent an unprecedented attempt to address environmental, economic and cultural values at both regional and local levels.  The agency is the lead organization responsible for creating and implementing region-wide solutions to protection.  The agency is a symbol of environmental responsibility and stewardship and provides a legal means to govern the region.  TRPA is recognized throughout the world for what it contributes to the science of resource protection.  Much of the effort put forth is groundbreaking and the problems addressed have no textbook remedies.  This is in part what makes the agency a lightning rod attracting a wide range of opinions and emotions.

The TRPA has adopted a three-pronged strategy to restore the environment of Lake Tahoe:

Implement a regulatory program minimizing the negative impacts of new development.
Improve the environment through a $1.5 billion capital improvement program repairing damage caused by past development.
Scientifically research the effectiveness of the regulatory and capital improvement programs.

The regulatory program has been in place for more than 35 years and is re-evaluated every five years.  While regulation is one of the pillars of the TRPA's plan, the agency also emphasizes the capital investment and scientific research components of its strategy which are embodied in the Environmental Improvement Program (EIP).

TRPA is primarily an environmental agency, but recognizes the interdependency of environmental, economic and social well being in the Tahoe Region.  Environmental groups, property rights advocates, business interests and numerous government agencies agree that tourism and successful, locally-owned businesses are the key to economic vitality at Lake Tahoe and are dependent upon the attractiveness of the region's environment.  The TRPA Regional Plan allows for a measured rate of residential, commercial and recreational growth, the impacts of which are controlled through mitigation measures.

Governance
The TRPA governing board consists of 15 members (members shown in italics are required to reside outside of the TRPA region):
 California delegation (7 members):
 One member appointed by the El Dorado County board of supervisors
 One member appointed by the Placer County board of supervisors
 One member appointed by the South Lake Tahoe city council
 Two members appointed by the Governor of California
 One member appointed by the speaker of the California State Assembly
 One member appointed by the California State Senate rules committee
 Nevada delegation (7 members):
 One member appointed by the Douglas County board of county commissioners
 One member appointed by the Washoe County board of county commissioners
 One member appointed by the Carson City board of supervisors
 One member appointed by the Governor of Nevada
 The Nevada Secretary of State (or his designee)
 The director of the Nevada Department of Conservation and Natural Resources (or his designee)
 One member chosen by the other members of the Nevada delegation
 One non-voting member chosen by the President of the United States
At present, the make up is composed of seven trained as attorneys (with the Executive Director licensed to practice law in Washington DC), five elected politicians, two environmentalists, and the Deputy Director from the Nevada Department of Conservation and Natural Resources.

Controversy and criticism
Since the Tahoe Regional Planning Agency must regulate how individuals develop their property within a fragile environment, controversy and criticism are no strangers.  The agency, by way of working with the community and stakeholders, has set limits on the amount of land that can be covered by buildings and pavement, called land coverage, on an individual parcel (ranging from 1% in highly sensitive areas to 30% in the least sensitive areas).  TRPA has been collecting scientific research on the effects of development on Lake Tahoe's clarity for more than 35 years, and regulating land coverage has been one of the most effective tools in protecting water quality, scenery, air quality, wildlife, forests, and in providing better recreation opportunities.

Property rights groups representing developers and real estate interests have repeatedly sued TRPA to weaken or eliminate environmental restrictions in the Tahoe Region. Real estate representatives and property rights groups have charged that the agency is too powerful and goes far beyond environmental protection, asserting that restrictions on development of private property violate the Takings Clause in the U.S. constitution.

There is also concern over the scientific evidence TRPA uses to form its regulations.  For example, for more than twenty years, construction of new piers in "prime fish habitat" areas was prohibited, but studies were later released that showed some manmade structures in "feeding and escape cover" habitat areas could actually benefit fish populations.

Criticism of TRPA often falls under the category of economics.  Some business owners and homeowners express concerns that they want more freedom to build or expand in order to realize the maximum value from their properties. TRPA says it works diligently to find innovative ways to allow property owners to develop their property in environmentally sensitive ways and has created programs that balance environmental impacts through mitigation.  Mitigation measures usually come in the form of fees which are used to fund much-needed environmental improvement and restoration projects.  Some feel that the fees amount to undue taxation, such as a per day fee for visitors renting a passenger vehicle.  As of 2002 this fee was $4.75 per day, the proceeds of which are used to fund public transportation.

In 2005, in an effort to bring all buoys on the lake into compliance with current regulations, TRPA initially proposed a buoy permitting fee of $5,000 for the first buoy and $7,500 for a second buoy.  Many residents protested thinking that the TRPA did not have the power to charge taxes.  Due to public opposition and guidance from the TRPA Governing Board, a new proposal was made in 2006 reducing the permitting fee to $500 for the first buoy and $1,500 for the second.  If the fee is approved, the agency claims it would be used to offset the impacts to water quality and to fund a watercraft and illegal buoy enforcement program.  The proposal, after two years of discussion, was supposed to be finalized in February 2007. But the League to Save Lake Tahoe and the Sierra Club, which want the pier moratorium to continue, continued to protest the changes. Furthermore, some California government agencies continue to question the environmental impacts of more piers.

Many individuals and public interest groups feel that TRPA does not go far enough in strictly controlling development.  They claim that, since Lake Tahoe belongs to everyone, property owners must take responsibility for the impacts of their development.  Further, supporters of the agency's policies point out that comprehensive management strategies in communities across the nation are often funded by assessing fees on the associated properties and participants who benefit the most from such impacts.

Other issues the agency is criticized for are fine amounts and local representation at the agency.  TRPA fine amounts are generally around $5,000 for violations like unpermitted tree-cutting.  While some critics say such fines aren't large enough since a wealthy lake front owner may happily pay that much to improve their view, other critics argue that it is further evidence of TRPA's over-reaching expansion.  Since TRPA is a bi-state entity with quasi-federal powers, state & local elected officials have little recourse in opposing the agency's strategies.  Although half of the TRPA's 15-member Governing Board is made up of locally elected officials, there is public sentiment that they have only the courts to turn to for balance. If anyone contests the agency's decisions, they feel they are painted as against the environment.  Furthermore, critics of the agency have alleged that TRPA staff represent themselves as "locals", which is actually true of most of the board and the staff, though a small percentage of staff members live outside the Tahoe basin, in nearby areas such as Carson City.  Since staff are the individuals with whom most of the negotiations are engaged, and who propose nearly all agenda items the Governing Board hears, there is local sentiment that the agency serves too few and is not working for the benefit of local residents and businesses. A movement led by local property rights groups and real estate developers to have all Governing Board members elected by local residents has been pushed for several years, but has thus far been resisted by government officials and environmental groups, due to concern that environmental protection of the lake will be compromised in favor of development.

An example of the controversy the agency faces is development in the shore zone.  Lake Tahoe's shore zone is where the lake meets the land.  Because of its relationship to the quality of scenery, recreation, and lake clarity, the shore zone is one of the most sensitive areas in the region.  The Environmental Protection Agency has designated Lake Tahoe as Outstanding National Resource Waters under the Clean Water Act. Having this special designation calls for a non-degradation standard and a high level of protection. There are only three bodies of water on the West Coast with this designation; Mono Lake in California, and Crater Lake in Oregon are the other two.

The shore zone of Lake Tahoe has a long and challenging history.  Regulations affecting the construction of piers, buoys and other shore zone-related issues have been researched and debated extensively since the 1980s.  The Tahoe Lakefront Homeowners Association and others call for fewer restrictions on development, claiming that every lake front property owner should be allowed to build a pier.  Other groups, such as the League to Save Lake Tahoe and the Sierra Club, argue that allowing hundreds of new piers will harm fish habitat and scenic quality, and will further block the public from access to beaches and will inhibit kayaking along the shore.

For more than 25 years, the TRPA has not allowed new structures such as piers in areas considered "prime fish habitat." These areas are still considered limited and fragile. However, aforementioned scientific studies were conducted over a period of 15 years that showed protective measures could be taken to reduce the impacts of additional piers on the lake and that some underwater structures actually benefited fish populations in "feed and escape cover" habitat areas.  In 2005 and 2006, after 20 years of debate, the agency released an environmental document with alternatives that would allow some new development in the shore zone, but says it balanced new development with programs that increased public beach access, protected sensitive areas, and set high standards for development.

According to the agency, the shore zone example shows how TRPA attempts to serve all members of the public fairly by using the best available science and planning practices to protect Lake Tahoe and create a balance between the man made and natural environments. The agency says it understands that on some controversial issues, consensus isn't possible. But after robust collaboration between TRPA and the public, common ground can emerge to move the process forward. Even so, the shore zone changes remain in limbo.

Angora Fire/Caldor Fire and backlash against TRPA

In June 2007, the Angora Fire burned  and destroyed 254 residences and many other structures adjacent to South Lake Tahoe. A reversal of the winds as the fire approached the city limits near the "Y" (junction of US50 and 89) saved the area from a far more devastating disaster. Owners, developers' rights groups, and local real estate lobbyists immediately charged that the structures burned because of TRPA's strict environmental regulations. While inconsistent with Cal Fire regulations, TRPA field staff prohibited property owners from establishing proper defensible space around their homes and required the laying down of newly fallen and highly flammable dry pine needles to serve as erosion control in favor of lake clarity. In public hearings, TRPA countered that defensible space has always been a significant agency concern, and has always been encouraged by the agency, citing published TRPA regulations, public documents, and previous public hearings. However, in post fire hearings stating this position, those that lost their homes were so infuriated that security escorts were required to protect TRPA Staff's exit.

Prompted by local newspaper articles quoting allegations of TRPA staff forcing homeowners to pile dry pine needles and other flammable materials around their homes, and even up against the structures, creating dangerous fire hazards, state and local politicians reacted swiftly by calling for investigations into TRPA policies and staff misconduct. In July 2007, California and Nevada governors Arnold Schwarzenegger and Jim Gibbons signed a bi-state "Blue Ribbon Fire Commission" agreement, to investigate fire issues in the Lake Tahoe basin, including TRPA regulations that caused problems that led to the loss of hundreds of structures.

While not meeting the legal threshold of staff misconduct and detrimental agency policies, the U.S. Forest Service fire investigations in the Angora Fire investigations confirmed that most of the structures caught fire from "firebrands"—pieces of burning wood—carried in the smoke column either from neighboring structures or from nearby burning vegetation. The investigations found that a few older homes had highly flammable wooden shake roofs and inadequate fire clearance around the structures. In some cases, winter fire wood and kindling supplies were piled too close to homes. The study did state that dead and dying vegetation along Angora Creek "likely contributed" to the fire's rapid spread. Native riparian vegetation in "stream environment zones" (such as Angora Creek) in the Tahoe Region are protected as sensitive resources, and removal of vegetation from these areas is vigorously restricted by TRPA to protect damage to soils, habitat, and water quality.

While fire investigators have concluded that several factors contributed to the disastrous fire, including unburned piles from previous forest thinning projects, lack of defensible space, stockpiling of flammable materials near structures, and thick ground covers, investigators found that several structures actually burned the surrounding vegetation—not the reverse.

There is continuing disagreement regarding ground cover within  of structures. In certain cases, TRPA regulations require ground cover to provide protection from soil erosion on disturbed soil. Ground cover may often be lawn or other landscaping, however site-specific native vegetation, or naturally occurring forest litter such as a thin layer of pine needles or wood chips, is generally the environmentally preferable alternative, and is more cost-effective and easier to maintain. However, freshly applied pine needles remain highly flammable until decomposition has fully occurred. Regardless, TRPA staff and local fire groups are investigating possible non-flammable or flame-retardant alternatives to provide both soil protection and fire prevention. In addition, TRPA staff and board members are working with the local fire protection districts to simplify procedures for homeowners to implement defensible space requirements around their homes, and eliminate confusion and possible conflicts regarding TRPA erosion control requirements and defensible space requirements, and to ease restrictions on use of heavy machinery in sensitive areas near communities.

While investigations into the causes and effects on the Angora Fire show that allegations of staff misconduct may have occurred, and resource protection policies may not have been the root cause of the disaster, anti-TRPA sentiment remains extremely high among most residents.  Many have concluded that the agency has infringed on property safety, constitutional private property rights, and impeded economic development in the Lake Tahoe region.

In August/September 2021, during the Caldor fire, government crews cut large swaths to the bare soil and aggressively thinned neighboring forests to protect the City.  This emergency act lowered the fire height from 100s of feet as was seen during the Angora fire approaching the Y-area, to about fifteen feet, thus saving the City.  As a result, significant tree thinning without the required TRPA permits and removal of freshly fallen pine needles to the bare ground occurred widely. Proactive techniques of applying Phos-check home defense fire retardant products to vegetation has also become more widespread. While clearly, the Angora Fire has reinvigorated the public taking hold of their own safety, the Caldor fire has cemented it.

See also
Tahoe-Sierra Preservation Council, Inc. v. Tahoe Regional Planning Agency, a 2002 United States Supreme Court case involving the regulatory power of the agency.

References

External links
TRPA Homepage
A Guide to the Walter E. MacKenzie papers, NC1060. Special Collections, University Libraries, University of Nevada, Reno
A Guide to the Tahoe Regional Planning Agency records, 82-37. Special Collections, University Libraries, University of Nevada, Reno.

United States interstate agencies
California law
Nevada law
Lake Tahoe